The Rome Italy Temple is a temple of the Church of Jesus Christ of Latter-day Saints (LDS Church) in Rome, Italy. The temple serves church members in Italy, as well as Malta, Greece, Cyprus, Albania, and parts of Romania. Thomas S. Monson, the LDS Church's president, initially announced the temple in 2008, a groundbreaking took place in 2010, and the temple opened after its dedication in 2019.

History

At first, only a small parcel was available for construction of a temple, but due to ensuing replanning, the entire 15 acres of the land was made available for its construction and the associated building.

Before the temple was built, the land was a farm that the LDS Church acquired in 1997, which included the property of a villa, an olive plantation, and pizza broiler on the outside. This was a place where church members used to gather and host activities from time to time; full-time missionaries also resided there for a period of time. 

On 4 October 2008, Monson announced plans to build a temple in Rome. In preparation for the construction, and as part of the permit process, all potential building sites in Rome must undergo a search for ancient Roman ruins by digging trenches every 10 to 15 feet apart across the entire property. Following the search for ruins on the temple property, it was announced that none were found, and construction would be permitted.

The groundbreaking ceremony for the temple was held 23 October 2010, with Monson presiding. Only invited guests were allowed to be at the groundbreaking, but the ceremony was rebroadcast to Latter-day Saint meetinghouses in Italy the following day, to provide greater participation. Dignitaries at the groundbreaking included Vice Mayor of Rome, Giuseppe Ciardi, Italian senator Lucio Malan, along with Monson, William R. Walker, and Erich W. Kopischke, each of whom were LDS Church general authorities.

On March 29, 2018, the LDS Church announced that a public open house would be held from January 28 through February 16, 2019, excluding Sundays.  All 15 of the LDS Church apostles attended the temple's dedication. This is believed to be the first time the entire First Presidency and Quorum of the Twelve Apostles were in the same location outside the United States.

The temple was formally dedicated in three sessions on March 10, 2019 by church president Russell M. Nelson, with two more sessions planned for each of the following two days.

In 2020, like all the church's other temples, the Rome Italy Temple was closed in response to the coronavirus pandemic.

Design 
Neils Valentiner, the architect of the Rome Italy Temple said its design is inspired by San Carlino Roman Catholic church in Rome, with a curved design on both the building's exterior and interior. The surfaces throughout the temple, including the floors, walls and countertops are made  of Perlato Svevo marbles, which were quarried in Italy. Other stones from Italy, Spain, Turkey, and Brazil are added to them to give emphasis.

At the temple's entrance is a floor-to-ceiling stained-glass wall that depicts a scene of Jesus Christ's life. An olive tree and its leaves are featured on other additional art-glass. Other inside highlights include an oval design staircase, a mural featuring Italian landscape from the ocean to the slopes in the instruction room, a Baroque-style bridal room with crystal sconces and hand-painted chairs, sculpted-off white carpets in the sealing and celestial rooms. Additionally, the baptistry is featured with elliptical font, inlaid stones and Roman-style acanthus leaves; original paintings can be found throughout the temple.

Location

The temple occupies part of a  LDS Church-owned site near the Grande Raccordo Anulare ring road skirting Cinquina in the northeast of Rome. This site is located in Rome's Municipio III (formerly IV), along the via di Settebagni.

Site 
The site includes the temple, a church meetinghouse, a visitor center, a Family History Center (FHC), a piazza, guest housing, and landscaped gardens and fountains. 

The Rome Italy Temple is a three-story building where LDS Church members perform religious ordinances. It is on the site's east, atop the piazza with stone steps and fountains that lead down to the visitor center on the opposite end. The meetinghouse where members and visitors gather together for Sunday church services and social activities during the week is on the west. Another building on the north accommodates patrons who traveled long distances and the FHC which offers resources, facilities, equipment and services for doing genealogy work.

Visitors' Center 
Near the entrance of the visitors' center is an art-glass work created by a team of 25 artists led by Tom and Gayle Holdman. It depicts the 100 references of Christ’s life on earth, containing symbols of His parables in the New Testament. 

Behind the art-work on the other side is a copy of Bertel Thorvaldsen's Christus statue, as well as copies of his twelve apostle statues found in the Lutheran Cathedral Church of Our Lady in Copenhagen, facing the temple in a rotunda, with an Italian landscape as background. 

Opposite to the statues is a see-through floor-to-ceiling glass window that reflects the statue of Christ on the temple across the grounds, a similar effect can be seen from outside the visitor center, where the temple is reflected on or near the statue of Christ. 

Other features in the visitor center include separate rooms and quiet places for reflection or missionary discussions with investigators and a small theater that plays the “Storms of Life” videos - recordings of how individuals confront and manage their challenges in real life.  Additionally, a large model of the temple is on display to show the rooms, settings, and inside features. A map showing locations of meetinghouses all across the country can be found upstairs with the Family History Center.

See also

 Comparison of temples of The Church of Jesus Christ of Latter-day Saints
 List of temples of The Church of Jesus Christ of Latter-day Saints
 List of temples of The Church of Jesus Christ of Latter-day Saints by geographic region
 Temple architecture (Latter-day Saints)
 The Church of Jesus Christ of Latter-day Saints in Italy

Notes

External links

 Rome Italy Temple Official English site
 Tempio di Roma Italia Official Italian site
 Rome Italy Temple at ChurchofJesusChristTemples.org
 Excerpts from "The Living Christ: The Testimony of the Apostles" at YouTube.com
 Rome Italy Temple: A New Light In The Eternal City at YouTube.com

21st-century Latter Day Saint temples
Religious buildings and structures in Rome
Temples in Italy
The Church of Jesus Christ of Latter-day Saints in Italy
Temples (LDS Church) completed in 2019